Richard Edmunds may refer to:

 Richard Edmunds (athlete) (born 1937), American sprinter
 Richard Edmunds (cricketer) (1970–1989), English cricketer
 Richard Edmunds (rower) (born 1947), American Olympic rower

See also
 Richard Edmonds (born 1943), English neo-Nazi
 Richard Edmonds (scientist) (1801–1886), British scientific writer
 Rick Edmonds (Richard Phillip Edmonds Jr.), member of the Louisiana House of Representatives